Sikhism in Iraq does not have a permanent population, but has a historical presence because of travels by Guru Nanak and Sikh soldiers stationed in Iraq during World War I and World War II.

It is likely that some Sikhs may be still be in Iraq but their numbers may be very small.

Guru Nanak's journey

Guru Nanak traveled vast distances in four major journeys with his Muslim Minstrel, Bhai Mardana. During one of those journeys, he traveled across the Muslim world and at one point stayed outside of Baghdad. According to historical sources he held a dialogue with Sheikh Bahlool Dana, a Sufi saint. At some point, a shrine to Guru Nanak was built alongside Bahlool Dana's tomb. In the chaos following the 2003 invasion of Iraq looters or vandals stripped the monument of religious texts and a plaque commemorating the meeting.
The Monument still exists but condition of the structure is not good, people reside nearby call this Baba Nanak Shrine , it is close to Al Muthunna near to Baghdad. Guru Nanak is traditionally locally known as Nanak Peer in Iraq.

World Wars

During both world wars Sikh soldiers in the British Army were posted in Iraq. During World War I the shrine to Guru Nanak  was rediscovered by a Sikh captain, Dr Kirpal Singh, after being forgotten for centuries. In the early 1930s Sikh soldiers repaired the shrine and during World War II continued its upkeep.

References

External links
 A 1969 article from "The Sikh Review" detailing the discovery of the monument to Guru Nanak in Baghdad

Religion in Iraq
Iraq